American actress and singer Jennifer Love Hewitt has recorded songs for four studio albums as well as a number of soundtracks and other projects. Hewitt first rose to prominence in the entertainment industry for acting in television commercials and the children's television series Kids Incorporated. At age 10, she moved with her mother from Killeen, Texas to Los Angeles to pursue a music career, and collaborated with Earth, Wind & Fire on the song "One World" for the 1990 compilation album Music Speaks Louder Than Words. Two years later, Hewitt recorded her first studio album Love Songs (1992) under the name "Love Hewitt". The video game company Meldac released Love Songs exclusively in Japan, and it includes cover versions of songs by ABBA and Michael Jackson. Prior to the album's release, Hewitt released the stand-alone cover of Blondie's "Heart of Glass" earlier in 1990. According to a 2013 Rolling Stone article, Love Songs led to Hewitt becoming a pop star in Japan. 

After Hewitt attracted further attention following her role in the family drama Party of Five, she released two studio albums in the United States through Atlantic. Let's Go Bang (1995) featured dance-pop and "light R&B", and her self-titled album (1996) had R&B-inspired pop music and adult contemporary music with lyrics about "love, loss, and longing". Following the two albums' poor sales, Hewitt was dropped by Atlantic and went on to act in several films and television programs. As well as starring in the 1998 slasher film I Still Know What You Did Last Summer, she recorded the 1999 single "How Do I Deal" for its soundtrack, which became the best-selling song of her career. In 2002, Hewitt signed a record contract with Jive, and her fourth studio album BareNaked was released in October that year. Recording "rock-oriented" songs, Hewitt collaborated with Meredith Brooks for the album. Hewitt said that she had more creative freedom with BareNaked since she was "able to find [her]self as an artist". She co-wrote nine of the album's thirteen songs and was involved with its arrangements and instrumentation.

In 2002, Hewitt wrote and recorded "I'm Gonna Love You (Madellaine's Love Song)" for the animated film The Hunchback of Notre Dame II, in which she also voiced the character Madeleine. She appeared in the 2004 television film A Christmas Carol, an adaptation of the original novella, and contributed to its soundtrack. Despite finding commercial success with BareNaked, Hewitt shifted away from music in 2004 to focus on her acting career, including the lead role in the supernatural television show Ghost Whisperer. Her final record was the compilation album, Cool with You: The Platinum Collection, released in Asia in June 2006. In 2013, she recorded five songs for the television drama The Client List, in which she starred as the lead character. In the same year, she also collaborated with Sophie B. Hawkins on a song for the comedy film Alpha Males Experiment.

Songs

Notes

References

Citations

Book sources

 

Hewitt, Jennifer Love